Vocento, S.A., also known as Grupo Vocento, is a Spanish mass media group. Its flagship daily newspaper is the conservative and monarchist ABC, also publishing El Correo. The group is also a player in the regional press sector, mainly owing to former properties of Correo (El Diario Montañés, La Verdad, Hoy, Ideal, Sur, La Rioja, El Norte de Castilla, El Comercio). Through Net TV, the group also owns a DDT license, which is leased to Paramount Network and Disney Channel.

History 
It has its origins in 1910 with the launch of El Pueblo Vasco, a newspaper founded by the Ybarra family, which merged with El Correo Español in 1938. In the 1940s they obtained shares in El Noticiero Bilbaíno and in 1948 they began its development with the acquisition of most of El Diario Vasco. The expansion outside the Basque Country (Spain) started in 1984 with the acquisition of shares in El Diario Montañés (Santander). In the 1980s the holding company Corporación de Medios de Comunicación Social (Comecosa) was created, which acquired 8 regional leading newspapers (Las Provincias, La Rioja, El Norte de Castilla, etc). In 1988 the newspaper La Verdad (Murcia), Hoy (Badajoz) and Ideal (Granada) were acquired. In 1990 the Diario Sur de Málaga was also incorporated.

Profile
The Group was established in 2001 as a result of the merger of Grupo Correo and Prensa Española. The company has its headquarters in Madrid. It is the national leader in the publication of general supplements (XLSemanal, MHMujer, El Semanal TV) and specialist magazines (Mi Cartera de Inversión, Motor 16 and corporate magazines). It also has held assets in the entertainment sector, in both radio and television (Telecinco (13%), Net TV, Fly Music), and in audiovisual production and distribution (Hospital Central, El Comisario and Pasapalabra, among others), as well as the Internet, with more than 19 million unique visitors. In addition, the company has a news agency, Colpisa.

Vocento is composed of over 120 companies, some of which are over a hundred years old, and it has a long track record of profitability and management successes. Since 8 November 2006, the Group has been listed on the Spanish stock market, with a market capitalisation of 1,875 million.

Vocento and ABC opened a new headquarters in Josefa Valcárcel in July 2020.

Holdings

Newspapers
In 2006 the share of the group in the Spanish press market was 25,7%.

References

External links
Official website

 
2001 establishments in Spain
Companies listed on the Madrid Stock Exchange
Conglomerate companies of Spain
Companies based in Madrid
Mass media in Madrid
Mass media companies established in 2001
Newspaper companies
Mass media companies of Spain